The following is a list of prominent people who were born in or have lived in the Malaysian state of Perlis, or for whom Perlis is a significant part of their identity.

A-L
 Abdul Hamid Omar – first Chief Justice of Malaysia, born in Kuala Perlis
 Abdul Latif Romly – athlete, born at Kampung Paya Kelubi
 Che Rosli Che Mat – politician, born in Arau
 Hani Mohsin – actor, born in Kangar

M-Z

References

 
Perlis